The Fatal Mistake is a 1924 American silent crime film directed by Scott R. Dunlap and starring William Fairbanks, Eva Novak and Wilfred Lucas.

Synopsis
A sacked newspaper reporter and a policewoman join forces to battle a gang of criminals.

Cast

References

Bibliography
 Bernard F. Dick. Columbia Pictures: Portrait of a Studio. University Press of Kentucky, 2015.

External links
 

1924 films
1924 crime films
American silent feature films
American crime films
American black-and-white films
Films directed by Scott R. Dunlap
Columbia Pictures films
1920s English-language films
1920s American films